Retifacies (Retifacies abnormalis) is an extinct arthropod, that lived in the lower Cambrian (about 518 million years ago). Its fossil remains have been found in the Maotianshan Shales of Yunnan, China. It is a member of the Artiopoda.

Description 

This large animal could reach 55 centimeters in length, even though most of the specimens found were smaller. The cephalic shield was short, and was followed by a dozen tergites that overlapped each other. The rear part of the body consisted of a large shield and a long segmented tail. All the tergites had a surface made up of irregular polygons, unknown among other Maotianshan arthropods.

Ventrally there were probably no eyes placed on peduncles, and immediately alongside there were two long antennae with short bristles. Like many primitive arthropods, this animal also had the classic biramous appendages, eighteen pairs in number. Three of these were positioned under the head, ten corresponded to the thoracic wipes and five were present in the caudal shield. The appendages consisted of a branch with ambulatory function (endopodium) with a thorny internal margin, and a branch - gill (exopodium) formed by a fin-shaped structure, consisting of twenty bristles.

Classification 
The vaguely similar appearance to that of a trilobite originally led scholars to think that Retifacies was a possible relative of Helmetia or Naraoia , two other primitive arthropods related to trilobites (Delle Cave and Simonetta 1991, Hou and Bergstrom 1997). Subsequently, another study on showed how Retifacies was related to other basal arthropods, as Emeraldella and Sidneyia , from the Burgess Shale in Canada, as part of Artiopoda, a placement that has been confirmed in subsequent studies. After a redescription of both taxa. Pygmaclypeatus from the same deposit is considered to be a sister taxon, based on the fact that both taxa share a multi-segmented tailspine.

Lifestyle 

Due to a lack of information about the gut morphology or contents, the reconstruction of the ecology of Retifacies is speculative. The authors of the 2022 redescription suggested that Retifacies was a benthic organism (living on the seafloor) that scavenged on the remains of soft-bodied organisms or organic matter.

References

Sources
 Hou, Chen & Lu, 1989. Early Cambrian new arthropods from Chengjiang, Yunnan. Acta Palaeontologica Sinica, 28, 42–57.
 Chen & Zhou, 1997. Biology of the Chengjiang fauna. Bulletin of the Natural Museum of Natural Science, 10, 11 – 106.
 Hou & Bergstrom, 1997. Arthropods of the Lower Cambrian Chengjiang fauna, southwest China. Fossils and strata, 45, 116 pp.
 Edgecombe & Ramskold, 1999b. Relationships of Cambrian Arachnata and the systematic position of Trilobita. Journal of Paleontology, 73, 263 – 287.
 Hou, Bergstrom, Wang, Feng & Chen, 1999. The Chengjiang fauna. Exceptionally well-preserved animals from 530 million years ago. 170 pp. Yunnan Science and Technology Press, Kunming, Yunnan Province, China.

Artiopoda
Cambrian genus extinctions